Papier may refer to :
paper in French, Dutch, Afrikaans, Polish or German, word that can be found in the following expressions:
Papier-mâché, a construction material made of pieces of paper stuck together using a wet paste
Papier collé, a painting technique and type of collage
Papier d'Arménie, a perfume coated paper
Le papier ne peut pas envelopper la braise, a 2007 French-Cambodian documentary film directed by Rithy Panh
sans papiers, a term for Illegal immigrants in French
Hans-Jürgen Papier (born 1943), a German scholar in Laws, Ex-President of the Federal Constitutional Court of Germany
Papier (company), British company